Eupoecilia charixantha is a species of moth of the family Tortricidae first described by Edward Meyrick in 1928. It is found in Sri Lanka.

References 

Moths described in 1928
Eupoecilia